Hanover Football Club is an intermediate-level football club playing in the Intermediate A division of the Mid-Ulster Football League in Northern Ireland which is the fourth tier in Northern Irish Football. They have been crowned champions of the Mid Ulster Football League three times. The most recent coming in 2019. They play all home games at Brownstown Park in Portadown, County Armagh.

Honours

First Team Honours
Bob Radcliffe Cup: 1
2017–18
Mid-Ulster Football League: 3
2001–02, 2006–07, 2018-19
Mid-Ulster Premier Cup: 4
2001-02, 2004-05, 2017-18, 2018-19
Mid-Ulster Marshall Cup: 2
2004-05, 2007-08
Mid-Ulster Beckett Cup: 1
2001-02

References

External links
 Daily Mirror Mid-Ulster Football League Official website
 nifootball.co.uk - (For fixtures, results and tables of all Northern Ireland amateur football leagues)

Association football clubs in Northern Ireland
Association football clubs established in 1965
Association football clubs in County Armagh
Mid-Ulster Football League clubs
1965 establishments in Northern Ireland